Eben Carleton Sprague (November 28, 1822 – February 14, 1895) was an American lawyer and politician from New York.

Life
He was born on November 28, 1822, in Bath, Grafton County, New Hampshire, the son of Noah Paul Sprague (1798–1879) and Abiah (Carlton) Sprague. He attended Phillips Exeter Academy, and graduated from Harvard College in 1843.

Career
Sprague studied law with Millard Fillmore and Solomon G. Haven and was admitted to the bar in 1846, and practicing in Buffalo, New York. From 1854 until his death, he practiced in partnership with Fillmore's son, Millard Powers Fillmore, and was an attorney for the Erie Railway.

He was elected and became a member of the New York State Senate (31st D.) in 1877 as a Republican.  Sprague served as the third Chancellor of the University of Buffalo from 1885 until his death in 1895. The first was former U.S. President Millard Fillmore and the second was Orsamus H. Marshall, the American lawyer, educator and historian.

Personal life
On June 25, 1849, he married Elizabeth Hubbard Williams (1831–1908), and they had eight children.  He died on February 14, 1895, in Buffalo, New York.

Sources
 THE OBITUARY RECORD; S. Carlton Sprague (sic) in NYT on February 15, 1895
 Obituary; E. Carlton Sprague in The Harvard Crimson on February 19, 1895
 Sprague genealogy
 Chancellors of Buffalo University

1822 births
1895 deaths
People from Bath, New Hampshire
Republican Party New York (state) state senators
Politicians from Buffalo, New York
Harvard College alumni
Phillips Exeter Academy alumni
Leaders of the University at Buffalo
19th-century American politicians
Lawyers from Buffalo, New York
19th-century American lawyers